Nick Drake (born 1961 in London) is a British poet and author.

Career
Drake's poems include From The Song Dynasty and Static.

Drake's "choral play" for the stage, All the Angels, was first performed in 2015 at the Sam Wanamaker Theatre.

Bibliography

Rahotep novels 
Nefertiti: The Book of the Dead 2007
Tuankhamun: The Book of Shadows 2010
Egypt: The Book of Chaos 2011

Poetry collections 
The Man in the White Suit 1999
From the Word Go 2007
The Farewell Glacier 2012
Out of Range 2018

References

External links
 "Interview with Nick Drake", Lidia Vianu, Desperado Essay-Interviews, Editura Universitatii din Bucuresti, 2006

1961 births
Living people
British poets
Writers from London
British male poets
Mystery writers
Crime fiction writers
Writers of historical mysteries